British Transport Police (BTP) is a national special police force that polices the railway network of England, Wales and Scotland. The force polices more than 10,000 miles of track and more than 3,000 stations and depots - tasked with ensuring the safety of the millions of people who use and work on the railways. 

BTP also polices the London Underground, Docklands Light Railway, the West Midlands Metro, Tramlink, part of the Tyne and Wear Metro, Glasgow Subway and the London Cable Car.

The force is funded primarily by the rail industry.

Jurisdiction 

As well as having jurisdiction across the national rail network, the BTP is also responsible for policing:
Croydon Tramlink
Docklands Light Railway
London Cable Car
Glasgow Subway
London Underground
Tyne and Wear Metro (between Fellgate and South Hylton)
West Midlands Metro

There are more than one billion passenger journeys annually on the main lines alone.

In addition, BTP, in conjunction with the French National Police (under the Border Police unit) –  – police the international services operated by Eurostar.

BTP is not responsible for policing the majority of the Tyne and Wear Metro (which is instead policed by Northumbria Police's Metro Unit) or the entirety of the Manchester Metrolink (policed by Greater Manchester Police). BTP also does not police heritage railways.

A BTP constable can act as a police constable outside their normal railway jurisdiction as described in the "Powers and status of officers" section.

Previous jurisdiction
BTP constables previously had jurisdiction at docks, ports, harbours and inland waterways, as well at some bus stations and British Transport Hotels. These roles fell away in 1985 with privatisation. The legislation was amended to reflect this in 1994.

History

Foundation 
The first railway employees described as "police" can be traced back to 30 June 1826. A regulation of the Stockton and Darlington Railway refers to the police establishment of "One Superintendent, four officers and numerous gate-keepers". This is the first mention of railway police anywhere and was three years before the Metropolitan Police Act was passed. They were not, however, described as "constables" and the description may refer to men controlling the trains rather than enforcing the law. Specific reference to "constables" rather than mere "policemen" is made by the BTP website article "A History of Policing the Railway" which states "The London, Birmingham and Liverpool Railway Companion of 1838 reports 'Each Constable, besides being in the employ of the company, is sworn as a County Constable.'" Further reference is made by the BTP to "an Act of 1838...which according to J. R. Whitbread in The Railway Policeman (Harrap, 1961) was the first legislation to provide for any form of policing of the railway whilst under construction, i.e. to protect the public from the navvies more or less."

The modern British Transport Police was formed by the British Transport Commission Act 1949 which combined the already-existing police forces inherited from the pre-nationalisation railways by British Railways, those forces having been previously formed by powers available under common law to parishes, landowners and other bodies to appoint constables to patrol land and/or property under their control. This is distinct from the establishment of a police force by statute, as applicable to the Metropolitan Police in 1829; BTP did not have jurisdiction on a statutory basis until the enactment of the Transport Police (Jurisdiction) Act 1994, which was subsequently amended by the Railways and Transport Safety Act 2003.

Policeman versus constable
Some early-19th-century references to "railway police" or "policemen" do not concern constables but instead describe the men responsible for the signalling and control of the movement of trains (it is still common colloquial practice within railway staff for their modern equivalents in signal boxes and signalling centres to be called "Bobbies"). These personnel carried out their duties mostly in the open beside the track and were often dressed in a similar manner (e.g. a top hat and frock coat) to early police constables but were not directly concerned with law enforcement. Historical references (including those originating from the BTP itself) to when the first group of true "constables" was organised to patrol a railway should be treated with caution. This warning is repeated by the Metropolitan Police Service (MPS) webpage dealing with MPS records of service which on the matter of records of other forces held by the Public Record Office (now the National Archives) states: "The occasional references to 'Police Department' in the railway staff records relate to signalmen etc., although some were simultaneously county constables."

 Navigators 
A huge workforce was required to build the ever-expanding railway system. These armies of rough workers – navigators, or "navvies" for short – brought fear into rural Victorian England. The Special Constables Act 1838 was passed which required railway and other companies to bear the cost of constables keeping the peace near construction works.

 Historical crime 

The continually expanding network of railways gave criminals new opportunities to move around the country and commit crime. The railways were pioneers of the electric telegraph and its use often involved the arrest of criminals arriving or departing by train. On 1 January 1845 a railway police sergeant became the first person to arrest a murderer following the use of an electric telegraph.

In 1838 the Royal Mail was conveyed by rail for the first time. The first mail thefts were reported shortly afterwards. In 1848 the Eastern Counties Railway lost 76 pieces of luggage in just one day, and by the following year thefts from the largest six railways amounted to over £100,000 a year.

The first railway murder was committed by Franz Muller, who robbed and killed a fellow passenger on a North London Railway train in 1864. However Railway police were not involved in his apprehension.

The first arrest abroad by the British police was made in 1874 when a Metropolitan Police inspector accompanied by a railway police inspector went to the United States to arrest an embezzler.

 Reorganisation 
From 1900, several railway companies re-organised their police forces. The London, Brighton and South Coast Railway virtually reformed their police force from scratch in that year, followed by the Great Eastern Railway, the North Eastern Railway and Midland Railway in 1910, the Caledonian Railway in 1917 and lastly the Great Western Railway in 1918.

 Inter-war years 
The Railways Act 1921 amalgamated over one hundred separate railway systems (of which about 20 had organised police forces) into four groups:

The Great Western Railway
The London and North Eastern Railway
The London, Midland and Scottish Railway
The Southern Railway

Each had its own police force controlled by a chief of police. These four forces were organised in the same way; each split into a number of divisions headed by a superintendent, divided into a number of divisions posts led by an inspector. Detectives worked with their uniformed colleagues at most locations. Many 'non-police' duties were retained however, with officers acting as crossing keepers or locking and sealing wagons.

 World War II 
During the war, the strength of the railway police doubled. With many men conscripted, special constables and women police were again employed.

 Post war 

In 1947 the Transport Act created the British Transport Commission (BTC) which unified the railway system. On 1 January 1949 the British Transport Commission Police' (BTCP) were created, formed from the four old railway police forces, the London Transport Police, canal police and several minor dock forces.

In 1957 the Maxwell-Johnson enquiry found that policing requirements for the railway could not be met by civil forces and that it was essential that a specialist police force be retained. On 1 January 1962 the British Transport Commission Police ceased to cover British Waterways property and exactly a year later when the BTC was abolished the name of the force was amended to the British Transport Police. In 1984 London Buses decided not to use the British Transport Police. The British Transport Docks Board followed in 1985 when it was privatised.

In the 1960s and 1970s BTP officers led by Detective Sergeant Derek Ridgewell gave false testimony to obtain convictions of young men in the British Black community on the London Underground on charges such as assault with intent to rob. Eventually some of the men, who became known as the Oval Four and Stockwell Six, managed to have their convictions overturned. In November 2021, the BTP chief constable apologised to the black community for the trauma caused by Ridgewell, and said his actions did "not define the BTP of today".

BTP previously used to police several sea ports and docks until privatisation and the dock board decision in 1985. This included undertaking immigration control at smaller ports until the Immigration Service expanded. The force crest still includes ports and harbours. BTP left the last ports it policed in 1990.

In 1984 a Dog Section Training School was opened at the force training establishment near Tadworth, Surrey. In 2010, dog training was moved from Tadworth and the training school was moved to the Metropolitan Police's Dogs Training School in Keston, London Borough of Bromley.

The force played a central role in the response to the 7 July 2005 London bombings. Three of the incidents were at London Underground stations: Edgware Road (Circle Line), Russell Square and Aldgate stations, and the Number 30 bus destroyed at Tavistock Square was very close to the then force headquarters of the BTP, the latter incident being responded to initially by officers from the force.

In May 2011, the Secretary of State for Transport Philip Hammond announced that British Transport Police would create an armed capability of its own with the added benefit of additional resilience and capacity to the overall UK police armed capability. The BTP are deployed on armed patrols using Glock 17 pistols, LMT AR-15 CQB carbines and tasers.

Route crime 
Route crime collectively describes crimes and offences of trespass and vandalism which occur on railway lines and can affect the running of train services. It is a minor but significant cause of death on British railways. The overwhelming majority – 95% in 2005 – of deaths are suicides with the rest being attributed to trespass.

Graffiti costs rail firms over £5million a year in direct costs alone. The BTP maintains a graffiti database which holds over 1900 graffiti tags, each unique to an individual. In 2005 BTP sent 569 suspects to court (an increase of 16% on 2004 figures).

In the North West Area BTP has joined forces with Lancashire Constabulary and Network Rail to combat theft of metal items and equipment from railway lines in an initiative called Operation Tremor. The BTP established Operation Drum in 2006 as a national response to the increase in metal theft offences and also chairs the relevant Association of Chief Police Officers working group.

Operation Shield is an initiative by BTP to reduce the number of knives carried by passengers on the rail network. This initiative came about after knife crime began to rise and also because of the murder of a passenger on a Virgin CrossCountry service travelling from Glasgow.

In 2013, in response a survey conducted by Transport for London, which showed that 15% of women using public transport in London had been the subject of some form of unwanted sexual behaviour but that 90% of incidents went unreported, the BTP—in conjunction with the Metropolitan Police Service, City of London Police, and TfL—launched Project Guardian, which aimed to reduce sexual offences and increase reporting.

List of chief constables 
Arthur West was appointed as the first Chief Constable in 1958; previously from 1949 to 1958, the BTP was led by a Chief Police Officer.
 Arthur West (1958–1963)
 William Owen Gay (1963–1974)
 Eric Haslam (1974–1981)
 Kenneth Ogram (1981–1989)
 Desmond O'Brien (1989–1997)
 David Williams (1997–2001)
 Ian Johnston (2001–2009)
 Andrew Trotter (2009–2014)
 Paul Crowther (2014–2021)
 Lucy D'Orsi (2021–present )

Funding 
The British Transport Police is almost wholly funded by the train operating companies, Network Rail, and the London Underground – part of Transport for London. Around 95% of BTP's funding comes from the train operating companies. Other operators with whom the BTP has a service agreement also contribute appropriately. This funding arrangement does not give the companies power to set objectives for the BTP, but there are industry representatives serving as members of the police authority. The police authority decides objectives. The industry membership represent five out of 13 members.

The force does not receive any direct funding from the Home Office, but may apply for grants – such as for special events, like the London 2012 Olympic Games. With BTP now playing a large role in counter-terrorism on the rail network, the force also receives some grants towards its firearms units.

The police authority has agreed its budget for 202122 at £328.1million.

Operational structure 

As of September 2021 BTP had a workforce of 3,113 police officers, 1,415 police staff, 251 police community support officers, 298 special constables, and 50 support volunteers. In terms of officer numbers it is the largest of the three special police forces and the 11th largest police force in the United Kingdom overall.

Divisions 
From 1 April 2014, the divisional structure changed from the previous seven division structure to a four division structure - according to BTP this new structure will 'deliver a more efficient force, generating savings to reinvest in more police officers across the railway network'.

A Division 
Based at BTP Headquarters in Central London, this division retains overall control of the other divisions and houses central functions including forensics, CCTV and major investigations. , 393 police officers, 10 special constables and 946 police staff are based at FHQ.

B Division 

This division covers London and the South East and southern areas of England. This division is further divided into the following sub-divisions:
 North
 Central
 South

, B Division houses the largest number of personnel of any BTP division: 1,444 police officers, 101 special constables, 191 PCSOs and 361 police staff.

C Division 
This division covers the North East, North West, the Midlands, South West areas of England and Wales. This division is further divided into the following sub-divisions:
 Pennine
 Midland
 Wales
 Western

, C Division houses the second largest number of personnel within BTP: 921 police officers, 127 special constables, 132 PCSOs and 180 police staff.

D Division 
This division covers Scotland. There are no sub-divisions within D Division.

, D Division is the smallest in terms of personnel housing 214 police officers, 24 special constables and 46 police staff.

E Division 
E Division (Specialist Operations) was formed in 2020, removing the counter-terrorism units and assets from A Division, and placing them into their own division.

E division comprises the force's specialist counter-terrorism units including the Firearms Unit, Dog Branch, Specialist Response Unit and others.

Former divisions 
Prior to April 2014, BTP was divided into seven geographical basic command units (BCUs) which it referred to as 'police areas':

 Scotland (Area HQ in Glasgow)
 North Eastern (Area HQ in Leeds)
 North Western (Area HQ in Manchester)
 London North (Area HQ in London - Caledonian Road)
 London Underground (Area HQ in London - Broadway)
 London South (Area HQ in London - London Bridge Street)
 Wales & Western (Area HQ in Birmingham)

Prior to 2007, there was an additional Midland Area and Wales and West Area; however, this was absorbed into the Wales and Western area and North Eastern area.

Communications and controls
BTP operates two force control rooms and one call-handling centre:
First Contact Centre: Based in Birmingham and responsible for handling all routine telephone traffic. This facility was created further to criticism by HMIC.
Force Control Room – Birmingham: Based in Birmingham – alongside the First Contact Centre – and responsible for C and D Divisions which cover the East Midlands, West Midlands, Wales, the North West of England, the North East of England, the South West of England and Scotland.
Force Control Room – London: Responsible for B Division which covers the South and East of England including Greater London (both TfL and Mainline).

Both FCRL and FCRB house an events control suite, and a 'silver suite' incident control room is located in the South East for coordinating major incidents and as a fallback facility.

The Home Office DTELS callsign for BTP is 'M2BX' and their events control suite is 'M2AZ' for force-wide events and incidents, and the South East and 'M2AY' for Outer London events and incidents.

BTP also have consoles within the Metropolitan Police C3i Special Operations Room (SOR).

Custody suites
The force only acquired the power to designate custody suites in 2001, whereby all of the custody suites up until that point were non-designated. The force previously ran a number of non-designated custody suites around the country, which had all been closed down by 2014. A non-designated custody suite only allows police to detain someone for six hours before they are either released (whether charged, bailed or released without charge) or transferred to a designated facility.

The force retains one designated custody suite that is operational at Brewery Road in London (20 cells), where persons arrested within a reasonable travelling distance are taken. A number of other BTP custody suites were operational in London but these were closed in 2017 due to concerns regarding the time that it took to transport prisoners there.

Designated custody suites have also been retained as over-spill facilities in London, but are not routinely open, at the following locations: Central London (ten cells), Wembley Park (nine cells), Hammersmith (four cells) and West Ham (four cells).

Specialist units

Emergency Response Unit 
A partnership between Transport for London (TfL) and BTP led to the formation of the ERU. The unit carries TfL engineers to incidents on the London Underground, such as one under accidents and terrorist incidents. The vehicles are driven by BTP officers, so once at the scene the officer performs regular policing duties in relation to any crime or public safety issues. The use of the blue lights on the unit's vehicles is subject to the same criteria as with any other police vehicle In December 2013, TfL announced that the trial of blue lights had ended, and that ERU vehicles would retain blue lights, as BTP drivers had halved the unit's response time to incidents. Some vehicles within the unit are dual liveried, allowing TfL engineers to operate the vehicles without a police driver. On these, 'police' branding can be removed and the vehicles returned to the 'emergency' branding utilised prior to the trial, with engineers utilising amber and red lighting as opposed to blue.

Emergency Intervention Unit 
Similar schemes have been implemented elsewhere in the country, including a partnership with Network Rail and South West Trains (SWT) in which a BTP officer crews an "Emergency Intervention Unit", which conveys engineers and equipment to incidents on SWT's network using blue lights. The scheme won the "passenger safety" category at the UK Rail Industry Awards in 2015. Another "Emergency Response Unit" was established in partnership with Network Rail in the Glasgow area in the run-up to the 2014 Commonwealth Games.

Medic Response Unit 
In May 2012, the BTP formed the Medic Response Unit to respond to medical incidents on the London Underground network, primarily to reduce disruption to the network during the 2012 Summer Olympics. The scheme was initially for a 12-month trial, and consisted of 20 police officers (18 police constables and two sergeants) and two dedicated fast-response cars. The officers attached to the unit each undertook a four-week course in pre-hospital care, funded by TfL. TfL estimated that around one third of delays on the London Underground were caused by "passenger incidents", of which the majority related to medical problems with passengers; the purpose of the unit is to provide a faster response to medical incidents, providing treatment at the scene with the aim of reducing disruption to the network. The unit also aims to assist passengers who may be distressed after being trapped on trains while an incident at a station is resolved. Its training and equipment is the same as that of the London Ambulance Service in order to ensure smooth hand-overs of patients. At the end of the trial period, in October 2013, the unit was reduced to eight officers; the other twelve returned to regular policing duties after TfL judged the results of the scheme to be less than conclusive. Officers from the unit treated over 650 people in the first year of operation, including rescuing a passenger who fell onto the tracks, and made 50 arrests.

Firearms unit 
In May 2011, the Secretary of State for Transport announced with agreement from the Home Secretary that approval had been given for BTP to develop a firearms capability following a submission to government in December by BTP. Government stated that this was not in response to any specific threat, and pointed out that it equipped the BTP with a capability that was already available to other police forces and that BTP relied upon police forces for assistance which was a burden. 

In February 2012, BTP firearms officers commenced patrols focusing on mainline stations in London and transport hubs to provide a visible deterrence and immediate armed response if necessary. Firearms officers carry a Glock 17 handgun and a LMT CQB 10.5" SBR carbine that may be fitted with a suppressor and are trained to armed response vehicle standard. 

In 2014, the Firearms Act 1968 was amended to recognise BTP as a police force under the Act in order to provide BTP a firearms licensing exemption the same as other police forces. 

In December 2016, firearms officers commenced patrolling on board train services on the London Underground. 

In May 2017, as part of the response to the Manchester Arena bombing, it was announced that firearms officers would patrol on board trains outside London for the first time. 

In June 2017, BTP announced that the force firearms capability would be expanding outside of London with plans to establish armouries and hubs at Birmingham and Manchester. In October 2017, BTP commenced an internal advertisement requesting expressions of interest from substantive constables for the role of firearms officers at Birmingham and Manchester.

Powers and status of officers

General powers 
Under s.31 of the Railways and Transport Safety Act 2003, British Transport Police officers have "all the power and privileges of a constable" when:
on track (any land or other property comprising the permanent way of any railway, taken together with the ballast, sleepers and rails laid thereon, whether or not the land or other property is also used for other purposes, any level crossings, bridges, viaducts, tunnels, culverts, retaining walls, or other structures used or to be used for the support of, or otherwise in connection with, track; and any walls, fences or other structures bounding the railway or bounding any adjacent or adjoining property)
on network (a railway line, or installations associated with a railway line)
in a station (any land or other property which consists of premises used as, or for the purposes of, or otherwise in connection with, a railway passenger station or railway passenger terminal (including any approaches, forecourt, cycle store or car park), whether or not the land or other property is, or the premises are, also used for other purposes)
in a light maintenance depot,
on other land used for purposes of or in relation to a railway, the transport police
on other land in which a person who provides railway services has a freehold or leasehold interest, and
throughout Great Britain for a purpose connected to a railway or to anything occurring on or in relation to a railway.

"Railway" means a system of transport employing parallel rails which provide support and guidance for vehicles carried on flanged wheels, and form a track which either is of a gauge of at least 350 millimetres or crosses a carriageway (whether or not on the same level).

A BTP constable may enter
 the track,
 a network,
 a station,
 a substation
 a light maintenance depot, and
 a railway vehicle.
without a warrant, using reasonable force if necessary, and whether or not an offence has been committed. It is an offence to assault or impersonate a BTP constable.

London Cable Car
BTP officers derive their powers to police the London Cable Car from the London Cable Car Order 2012.

Outside natural jurisdiction 
BTP officers need however to move between railway sites and often have a presence in city centres. Consequently, they can be called upon to intervene in incidents outside their natural jurisdiction. ACPO (now the NPCC) estimate that some 8,000 such incidents occur every year. As a result of the Anti-terrorism, Crime and Security Act 2001 BTP officers can act as police constables outside their normal jurisdiction in the following circumstances:

On the request of a constable 
If requested by a constable of:
a territorial police force,
the Ministry of Defence Police (MDP), or
the Civil Nuclear Constabulary (CNC)
to assist him/her in the execution of their duties in relation to a particular incident, investigation or operation, a BTP constable also has the powers of the requesting officer for the purposes of that incident, investigation or operation. If a constable from a territorial police force makes the request, then the powers of the BTP constable extend only to the requesting constable's police area. If a constable from the MDP or CNC makes the request, then the powers of the BTP officer are the same as those of the requesting constable.

On the request of a chief constable (mutual aid) 

If requested by the chief constable of one of the forces mentioned above, a BTP constable takes on all the powers and privileges of members of the requesting force. This power is used for planned operations, such as the 2005 G8 summit at Gleneagles.

Spontaneous requirement outside natural jurisdiction 
A BTP constable has the same powers and privileges of a constable of a territorial police force:
in relation to people whom they suspect on reasonable grounds of having committed, being in the course of committing or being about to commit an offence, or
if they believe on reasonable grounds that they need those powers and privileges in order to save life or to prevent or minimise personal injury or damage to property.

A BTP constable may only use such powers if he believes on reasonable grounds that if he cannot do so until he secures the attendance of or a request from a local constable (as above), the purpose for which he believes it ought to be exercised will be frustrated or seriously prejudiced.

The policing protocol between BTP and Home Office forces set outs the practical use of these extended powers.

Cross-border powers

Channel Tunnel Act 1987 

When policing the Channel Tunnel, BTP constables have the same powers and privileges as members of Kent Police when in France, and will also be under the direction and control of the Chief Constable of Kent.

Criminal Justice and Public Order Act 1994 

A BTP constable can:

 When in Scotland, execute an arrest warrant, warrant of commitment and a warrant to arrest a witness (from England, Wales or Northern Ireland), and
 When in England or Wales, execute a warrant for committal, a warrant to imprison (or to apprehend and imprison) and a warrant to arrest a witness (from Scotland).

When executing a warrant issued in Scotland, a BTP constable executing it shall have the same powers and duties, and the person arrested the same rights, as they would have had if execution had been in Scotland by a constable of Police Scotland. When executing a warrant issued in England, Wales or Northern Ireland, a constable may use reasonable force and has specified search powers provided by section 139 of the Criminal Justice and Public Order Act 1994.

Policing and Crime Act 2017 

A BTP constable, other than a special constable, can:

 When in Scotland, arrest an individual they suspect of committing a specified offence in England and Wales or Northern Ireland if the Constable is satisfied that it would not be in the best interests of justice to wait until a warrant has been issued under the Criminal Justice and Public Order Act 2004.
 When in England or Wales, arrest a person they suspect of committing a specified offence in Scotland or Northern Ireland, or the constable has reasonable grounds to believe that the arrest is necessary to allow the prompt and effective investigation of the offence or prevent the prosecution of the offence being hindered by the disappearance of the individual.

The power can be exercised on or off of transport property without restriction.

This is the only known power that is available to 'regular' BTP constables and not BTP special constables as a result of the Policing and Crime Act 2017 stating that the power is available to constables attested under Section 24 of the Railways and Transport Safety Act 2003 (BTP special constables are appointed under Section 25 of the aforementioned Act).

National and international maritime policing powers 

BTP constables (both 'regular' and special constables) are designated as law enforcement officers in the same way as members of a territorial police force under Chapter 5 of the Act. This allows them to exercise maritime enforcement powers, including the powers of arrest for offences that could be subject to prosecution under the laws of England and Wales, Northern Ireland or Scotland, in relation to:

 a British ship in England and Wales, Northern Ireland or Scottish waters, foreign waters or international waters,
 a ship without nationality in England and Wales waters or international waters,
 a foreign ship in England and Wales waters or international waters, or
 a ship, registered under the law of a relevant territory, in England and Wales waters or international waters.

Attestation 

Constables of the BTP are required by S.24 of the Railways and Transport Safety Act 2003 (and special constables of the BTP are required by S.25) to make one of the following attestations, depending on the jurisdiction in which they have been appointed:

England and Wales 

[Police Act 1996, Schedule 4 as amended.]

The attestation can be made in Welsh.

Scotland 
Constables are required to make the declaration required by s.10 of the Police and Fire Reform (Scotland) Act 2012 before a sheriff or justice of the peace.

Status 

A BTP constable does not lose the ability to exercise his powers when off duty. Section 22 of the Infrastructure Act 2015 repealed section 100(3)(a) of the Anti-terrorism, Crime and Security Act 2001 which required BTP officers to be in uniform or in possession of documentary evidence (i.e. their warrant card) in order to exercise their powers. The repeal of this subsection, which came into effect on 12 April 2015, now means BTP officers are able to use their powers on or off duty and in uniform or plain clothes regardless of whether they are in possession of their warrant card.

On 1 July 2004 a police authority for the British Transport Police was created. BTP officers became employees of the police authority; prior to that, they were employees of the Strategic Rail Authority.

Rank insignia

Special constabulary

History
British Transport Police first recruited special constables in a trial based in the North West Area in 1995, and this was expanded to the whole of the UK.

Many specials are recruited from the wider railway community and those working for train operating companies are encouraged by their employers.

Powers and Authority
Under the terms of the Railways and Transport Safety Act 2003 and the Anti-terrorism, Crime and Security Act 2001, BTP special constables have identical jurisdiction and powers to BTP regular constables; primary jurisdiction on any railway in Great Britain and a conditional jurisdiction in any other police force area.

Uniform
BTP specials do not wear the 'SC' insignia (a crown with the letters SC underneath) on their epaulettes unlike some of their counterparts in some Home Office police forces.

Size
As of September 2021, the BTP special constabulary numbered 298 officers working across Great Britain.

Structure
The special constabulary has followed many Home Office forces in implementing a rank structure for special constables. 

This consists of a special chief officer, a special superintendent, three special chief inspectors (one for A & E Division, one for B Division and one for C & D Division), a number of special inspectors and a number of special sergeants per Sub-Division.

Federation and Taser
In January 2022 the British Transport Police Police Federation allowed BTP special Constables to join, a precondition for an announcement in May 2022 that specials would be trained to carry tasers.

Rank Structure
The BTP Special Constabulary rank structure differs from the regular officers' structure, although some are similar.

The structure is as follows:

Special Constables can progress up the rank structure. Whilst the names may be similar to other ranks (e.g. Inspector), the insignia is different, so that regulars and Specials can be easily distinguished.

Police community support officers (PCSO) 

British Transport Police are the only special police force that employ police community support officers (PCSOs). Section 28 of the Railways and Transport Safety Act 2003 allows the BTP Chief Constable to recruit PCSOs and designate powers to them using the Police Reform Act 2002 which previously only extended to chief constables or commissioners of territorial police forces

The BTP started recruiting PCSOs on 13 December 2004. The first of them went out on patrol for the first time on Wednesday 5 January 2005. They mostly work in the force's neighbourhood policing teams (NPTs).

BTP is one of only three forces to issue its PCSOs handcuffs, the other two being North Wales Police and Dyfed-Powys Police. This is in addition to leg restraints.  BTP PCSOs also utilise generally more powers than their counterparts in other forces.

As of 2016, the BTP has 362 PCSOs.

Although BTP polices in Scotland (D Division) it does not have any PCSOs in Scotland due to limitations of the Police Reform Act 2002, the law that empowers PCSOs which does not extend to Scotland. Although unlike police officers there is no formal transfer process. BTP is known to often attract PCSOs already serving in other police forces.

One of BTPs PCSOs is credited with making the force's largest ever illegal drugs seizure from one passenger when on 30 September 2009 PCSO Dan Sykes noticed passenger James Docherty acting suspiciously in Slough railway station only to find him in possession of £200,000 worth of Class C drugs. PCSO Sykes then detained Docherty who was then arrested and later imprisoned after trial.

In 2006 PCSO George Roach became the first BTP PCSO to be awarded a Chief Constable's Commendation after he saved a suicidal man from an oncoming train at Liverpool Lime Street railway station.

Accident investigation  
Until the 1990s the principal investigators of railway accidents were the inspecting officers of HM Railway Inspectorate, and BTP involvement was minimal. With major accidents after the 1988 Clapham Junction rail crash being investigated by more adversarial public inquiries, the BTP took on a more proactive role in crash investigations. Further reforms led to the creation by the Department for Transport of the Rail Accident Investigation Branch which takes the lead role in investigations of accidents.

Proposed mergers and jurisdiction reforms 

Although the British Transport Police is not under the control of the Home Office, and as such was not included as part of the proposed mergers of the Home Office forces of England and Wales in early 2006, both the then London mayor Ken Livingstone and then head of the Metropolitan Police Sir Ian Blair stated publicly that they wanted a single police force in Greater London. As part of this, they wished to have the functions of the BTP within Greater London absorbed by the Metropolitan Police. However, following a review of the BTP by the Department for Transport, no changes to the form and function of the force were implemented, and any proposed merger did not happen.

There were Scottish government proposals for the BTP's Scottish division (D Division) to be merged with Police Scotland. However the merger was postponed indefinitely in August 2018.

In 2006 it was suggested BTP take on airport policing nationally.

In 2010, it was suggested that BTP take on VOSA traffic officers and Highways England traffic officers. It was estimated BTP would save £25million if this went ahead. Contrary to popular belief, it was not proposed to merge Home office forces traffic units.

As of 2017 the government made a manifesto commitment to merge BTP, the Civil Nuclear Constabulary and Ministry of Defence police into a single "British Infrastructure Police". Originally after the 2015 Paris attacks, it was thought fully arming BTP and merging the three force would create a significant boost to firearms officer number in the UK and they could act as a nationwide counter terrorism force. Two options for this were developed;

Option 1: A single National Infrastructure Constabulary combining the function of the Civil Nuclear Constabulary, the Ministry of Defence Police, the British Transport Police, the Highways England Traffic Officer Service, DVSA uniformed enforcement officers and Home Office police forces' airport and port police units, along with private port police; or

Option 2: A Transport Infrastructure Constabulary and an Armed Infrastructure Constabulary, with the first bringing together the functions carried out by BTP, the Highways England Traffic Officer Service, DVSA uniformed enforcement officers and Home Office police forces' airport and port police units, along with private port police. The Armed Infrastructure force would be a merger of MDP and CNC.

Discussing the review in January 2017, DCC Hanstock commented on the specific responsibilities of BTP and stakeholder responses to the infrastructure policing review:

In June 2018 it was reported that these proposals had also been shelved for the time being. The only consensus it seems is that BTP would be suited to taking on airport and port policing as opposed to other modes of transport.

See also 

List of police forces of the United Kingdom
Policing in the United Kingdom
Transit police
Railroad police

Notes

References

External links 

 
 British Transport Police History Group

 
Department for Transport
Transport authorities in London
1948 establishments in the United Kingdom
Organizations established in 1948
British Transport Commission
Railroad police agencies
National police forces of the United Kingdom
Rail transport in the United Kingdom
Specialist law enforcement agencies of the United Kingdom